List of languages by time of extinction

List of extinct languages of Africa
List of extinct languages of Asia
List of extinct languages in Central America and the Caribbean
List of extinct languages of Europe
List of extinct languages of North America
List of extinct languages of South America

See also
Extinct language
Language policy
Language death
Lists of endangered languages
List of revived languages
The Red Book of the Peoples of the Russian Empire

 

zh:滅亡語言列表